Dame Frances Helen Wilde  (née Kitching, born 11 November 1948) is a New Zealand politician, and former Wellington Labour member of parliament, Minister of Tourism and Mayor of Wellington. She was the first woman to serve as Mayor of Wellington. She was chairperson of the Greater Wellington Regional Council from 2007 until 2015, and since 2019 she has chaired the board of the Museum of New Zealand Te Papa Tongarewa.

Early life and career
Wilde was born Frances Helen Kitching on 11 November 1948 in Wellington, New Zealand. She attended St Mary's College and later at Wellington Polytechnic (gaining a diploma in journalism) and Victoria University (graduating with a degree in political science). Upon finishing her education Wilde gained employment as a journalist.

In 1968, she married Geoffrey Gilbert Wilde, and the couple went on to have three children before divorcing in 1983.

She joined the Labour Party in 1972 and was later the editor of the party newsletter, New Nation. She later became the chairperson of the electorate in which she resided and a member of Labour's executive council in the Wellington region.

Political career

Member of Parliament and Minister

Wilde was a Member of Parliament for the  seat, winning it from sitting National MP Ken Comber in the 1981 general election. In 1983 she was appointed as Labour's spokesperson for State Services by Labour leader David Lange. Wilde retained the seat at the subsequent 1984 general election. She was Labour's junior Parliamentary Whip from 1984 to 1987.

In 1985, Wilde moved what became the Homosexual Law Reform Act 1986, which legalised homosexual acts in New Zealand between consenting men. The 16-month debate about the bill polarised the country, and sparked violent demonstrations and angry rallies at Parliament. Her other main legislative achievement in Parliament was an Adoption Reform Act, which made it possible for adopted people and their birth-parents to contact each other.

From 1987 Wilde served as an Associate Minister outside Cabinet in the Foreign Affairs, Housing, Conservation and Pacific Island Affairs portfolios and Minister for Disarmament and Arms Control in the second term of the Fourth Labour Government. When Geoffrey Palmer became Prime Minister, Wilde was promoted into Cabinet and appointed Minister of Tourism alongside her continuing roles as Minister for Disarmament and Arms Control and Associate Minister of External Affairs and Trade. Between 1990 and 1992, in opposition, she was Labour's spokesperson for Tourism, Disarmament and Ethnic Affairs.

Mayor of Wellington

In 1992 she resigned from Parliament to stand for Mayor of Wellington. Her seat was retained by Labour, with Chris Laidlaw winning the 1992 by-election caused by Wilde's resignation. She won the Mayoralty, and remained in office until 1995 when she chose to retire. During her time as Mayor, Wilde worked to improve Wellington's image and continuing on from the city's strong anti-nuclear sentiments she declared Wellington a Peace Capital in 1993. Wilde also spearheaded initiatives like the planning and construction of the WestpacTrust Stadium which features an elevated accessway to its entrance known as the "Fran Wilde Walk" which was opened in June 2005.

After leaving the mayoralty Wilde was appointed the chair of the Housing New Zealand board and, from 1997 to 2003, chief executive of Trade New Zealand.

Greater Wellington Regional Council
Wilde returned to local politics in 2004, successfully contesting a seat on the Wellington Regional Council. It had been suggested that she would retire after a single term; however, Wilde was re-elected to the Regional Council in 2007 and was elected, by her fellow councillors, the chair of the council on 30 October that year. She was returned as both a councillor and the chair in 2010 and 2013.

Wilde was a strong proponent of the super city proposal for Wellington. When the Local Government Commission rejected the proposal, Wilde received a letter signed by nine of her fellow councillors asking her to stand down as chair. Wilde stepped down from the chair's position from 30 June 2015, but remained a regional councillor. She was succeeded as chair by Chris Laidlaw and did not stand for re-election in 2016.

District Health Board 
Wilde contested and was elected to the Capital and Coast District Health Board in 2016 and was appointed the deputy chair of the board. Wilde did not seek re-election in 2019.

Career after politics 
Following her departure from the Regional Council, Wilde was appointed as the Chair of the Remuneration Authority. She has also served as the deputy chair and acting chair of the NZ Transport Agency.

Wilde was appointed to the board of the Museum of New Zealand Te Papa Tongarewa in 2015. She became the board's deputy chair in January 2019, and has been its chair since 1 July 2019.

Wilde is on the board of Kiwi Can Do, an organisation which helps unemployed New Zealanders get back into work.

Honours 
In 1993, Wilde was awarded the New Zealand Suffrage Centennial Medal. Wilde was appointed a Companion of the Queen's Service Order for public services in the 1996 New Year Honours; a Companion of the New Zealand Order of Merit in the 2012 New Year Honours for services to local-body affairs and the community; and a Dame Companion of the New Zealand Order of Merit in 2017 for services to the State and the community.

Family
She has three adult children from her first marriage to Geoffrey Wilde. Her husband Christopher Kelly, a former veterinary surgeon, was CEO of Landcorp.

See also
 LGBT rights in New Zealand

Notes

References

External links
 Fran Wilde, left, in 1987 (photo) 
 GayNZ.com article on Fran Wilde

1948 births
Living people
Mayors of Wellington
New Zealand Labour Party MPs
Members of the New Zealand House of Representatives
New Zealand MPs for Wellington electorates
Women mayors of places in New Zealand
Wellington regional councillors
Women members of the New Zealand House of Representatives
Dames Companion of the New Zealand Order of Merit
Companions of the Queen's Service Order
New Zealand Women of Influence Award recipients
Recipients of the New Zealand Suffrage Centennial Medal 1993
People educated at St Mary's College, Wellington
People associated with the Museum of New Zealand Te Papa Tongarewa
Capital and Coast District Health Board members